Jürgen Busch (born 24 December 1942) is a German long-distance runner. He competed in the marathon at the 1968 Summer Olympics representing East Germany.

References

1942 births
Living people
People from Teuchern
People from the Province of Saxony
German male long-distance runners
German male marathon runners
Sportspeople from Saxony-Anhalt
Olympic athletes of East Germany
Athletes (track and field) at the 1968 Summer Olympics
20th-century German people